Thurrock Thames Gateway Development Corporation was a non-departmental public body sponsored by the Department for Communities and Local Government. It was an Urban Development Corporation set up by the Government of the United Kingdom covering the entire borough and unitary authority of Thurrock in Essex. It handled large planning applications in the borough, and was part of the government's plan for urban expansion in the Thames Gateway.

Thurrock Thames Gateway Development Corporation opened for business in 2005 to drive economic growth in Thurrock, create homes, jobs and opportunities and make Thurrock a place where people want to live and work. The Corporation was given a target of creating 26,000 jobs and 18,500 homes in the borough and given the power to determine major planning applications to help achieve this.

The Corporation encouraged and managed new projects and was committed to achieving growth and improvement in the Borough. It received annual government funding and was eligible to bid for more to support key projects, such as the development of Purfleet centre. It also worked to attract private sector investment in Thurrock.

In 2007, following public consultation, it was planned for its remit to last until 2014. At the end of the premiership of Gordon Brown, there was an intention to merge the Corporation into the Homes and Communities Agency. However, following its emphasis on localism, the 2010 coalition government merged the Corporation with Thurrock Borough Council on 1 April 2012. and Thurrock Thames Gateway Development Corporation was formally abolished on 31 October 2012.

See also
London Thames Gateway Development Corporation

References

External links
Thurrock Development Corporation
The Thurrock Development Corporation (Area and Constitution) Order 2003

2004 establishments in the United Kingdom
2012 disestablishments in the United Kingdom
Defunct public bodies of the United Kingdom
Department for Levelling Up, Housing and Communities
Development Corporations of the United Kingdom
Government agencies established in 2004
Government agencies disestablished in 2012
Thames Gateway
Thurrock